Manuel Monge is one of the 14 municipalities of the state of Yaracuy, Venezuela. The municipality is located in northern Yaracuy, occupying an area of 474 km ² with a population of about 10,600 inhabitants. The capital lies at Yumare.

Like most municipalities in Yaracuy State, its economy is based on agriculture, producing oranges, sugar cane, corn and banana and also significant amounts of celery, taro and sorghum. The livestock sector is notable for the production of cow's milk.

External links
Official site

Municipalities of Yaracuy